Landesfunkhaus Niedersachsen (Lower Saxony state broadcast station) is a group of buildings of the public broadcaster Norddeutscher Rundfunk in Hanover, the state capital of Lower Saxony.

The broadcaster is based in Hamburg, but has facilities in the capitals of other states that it serves. When it was built from 1949 to 1952, it was known as the Funkhaus Hannover (Broadcast station Hannover). It includes two halls for public concerts, Großer Sendesaal (1963) and Kleiner Sendesaal, also administrative buildings and an antenna tower.

History 
The history of broadcasting in Hanover dates back to 1924 when the first radio programs were aired from a factory building of the engineering firm Hanomag. After World War II that building was in the British zone. Regular broadcasting, now by the Nordwestdeutscher Rundfunk (NWDR) began in 1948, including symphony concerts and the series Funkbilder aus Niedersachsen (radio images from Lower Saxony), which began with the second Export-Messe.

Plans for a new Funkhaus began end of 1948. Rudolf Hillebrecht, responsible for municipal building, voted for the location, to set an example for buildings along the lake. The first buildings were completed in 1950, and inaugurated on 20 January 1951. Due to the advanced technical equipment of the complex, it was immediately called the most modern Funkhaus in Europe. In 1955 the NWDR was split in the NDR in Hamburg and the Westdeutscher Rundfunk (WDR) in Cologne. A redaction team of the NDR was installed in the Funkhaus in 1958.

Oesterlen designed the concert hall Großer Sendesaal which was built from 1960 to 1963. From 1 January 1981, the complex was called Landesfunkhaus Niedersachsen. In 1989 it became a registered monument of the Denkmalschutz.

Literature 
 Waldemar R. Röhrbein (ed.): 60 Jahre Rundfunk in Hannover. 1924-1984, catalogue of the Historisches Museum Hannover, 1984; Contents
 Wolfram Köhler (ed.): Das Funkhaus Hannover. Beiträge zur Geschichte des Rundfunks in Niedersachsen, berücksichtigt auch Musiksendungen und Musikpflege des Senders und enthält ein Kapitel vom Rundfunkorchester, Hannover: Schlütersche Verlagsgesellschaft, 1987, ; Contents
 Hans-Ulrich Wagner: Hamburgs "Kleines Haus": Das Funkhaus Hannover, in Peter von Rüden (ed.): Die Geschichte des Nordwestdeutschen Rundfunks, vol. 1, 1st edition, Hamburg: Hoffmann und Campe, 2005,  und

References

External links 

 Niels Rasmussen: Besuchen Sie uns im NDR Landesfunkhaus!

Norddeutscher Rundfunk
1950s architecture
1960s architecture
Buildings and structures in Hanover
Broadcasting in Germany
Radio in Germany
Mass media in Hanover
Concert halls in Germany
Tourist attractions in Hanover